Yan Ming (born 6 December 1969) is a Chinese swimmer who competed at the 1988 and 1992 Summer Olympics.

References

External links
 

1969 births
Living people
Olympic swimmers of China
Swimmers at the 1988 Summer Olympics
Swimmers at the 1992 Summer Olympics
Universiade medalists in swimming
Place of birth missing (living people)
Asian Games medalists in swimming
Swimmers at the 1986 Asian Games
Swimmers at the 1990 Asian Games
Asian Games gold medalists for China
Asian Games silver medalists for China
Medalists at the 1986 Asian Games
Medalists at the 1990 Asian Games
Universiade bronze medalists for China
Medalists at the 1987 Summer Universiade
Chinese female freestyle swimmers
Chinese female medley swimmers
20th-century Chinese women